Macro (or MACRO) may refer to:

Science and technology
 Macroscopic, subjects visible to the eye
 Macro photography, a type of close-up photography
 Image macro, a picture with text superimposed
 Monopole, Astrophysics and Cosmic Ray Observatory (MACRO), a particle physics experiment
 Macronutrients, classes of chemical compounds humans consume in the largest quantities (i.e., proteins, fats, and carbohydrates)

Sociology
 Macrosociology, sociology at the national level
 Macroeconomics, economics at a higher level, above individual markets
 Macromanagement in business, the idea of "managing from afar"

Computing
 Macro (computer science), a set of instructions that is represented in an abbreviated format
 Macro instruction, a statement, typically for an assembler, that invokes a macro definition to generate a sequence of instructions or other outputs
 Macro key, a key found on some keyboards, particularly older keyboards.

Media and entertainment
 Macromanagement (gameplay), high-level decision making in games
 Macro Recordings, a German electronic music label
 Macro analysis of chords and chord progressions

Other uses
 Macro practice or community practice, a type of social work
 Macrobiotics, a diet and lifestyle based on eating natural, organic food
 Museum of Contemporary Art of Rome (MACRO), Italy
 Cox Macro (1686–1767), English Anglican priest and antiquarian
 Naevius Sutorius Macro (21 BC – 38 AD), praetorian prefect in the Roman Empire

See also
 Makro, a retail brand
 Micro (disambiguation)
 Mikro (disambiguation)
 Large (disambiguation) (macro: a Greek prefix meaning long or large)
 List of commonly used taxonomic affixes